Snowbound is a 2001 thriller film directed by Ruben Preuss and starring Erika Eleniak, Monika Schnarre, and Peter Dobson.

Cast
 Erika Eleniak as Barbara Cates
 Monika Schnarre as Liz Garnett
 Peter Dobson as Gunnar Davis

External links

2001 films
2001 thriller films
American thriller films
2000s English-language films
2000s American films